The Other Wes Moore: One Name, Two Fates is a 2010 nonfiction book by Wes Moore. Published by Spiegel & Grau, it describes two men of the same name who had very different life histories. Tavis Smiley wrote the afterword.

The author stated "The other Wes Moore is a drug dealer, a robber, a murderer. I am a Rhodes scholar, a White House Fellow, a former Army officer. Yet our situations could easily have been reversed." Jen Steele of the Milwaukee Journal-Sentinel wrote that "Moore's message is that it takes a village - and a bit of luck - to successfully navigate the negative surroundings where so many urban youths grow up." Dave Rosenthal of The Baltimore Sun stated that the comparison and contrast between the Moores was similar to that between different sections of Baltimore, which have neighborhoods of varying levels of quality and safety.

In his interview, the author stated that his intended audience includes young people who are "going through transitions to adulthood" as well as their parents and guardians, other people who work with them, and people in organizations working with youth.

Background

The lives of the two Wes Moores
The author served in the U.S. military, was an aide to Condoleezza Rice, and worked in investment banking. The author, whose father died after a medical misdiagnosis, stated that he was, as a pre-teen, failing classes and getting into legal trouble, but that his life changed after his mother sent him to Valley Forge Military Academy and College.

The book also documents Wesley John "Wes" Moore, born in 1975, who was also raised in Baltimore in the 1980s. This Moore, whose father abandoned him, sold illegal drugs. Wesley's mother Mary Moore, who had an associate's degree from the Community College of Baltimore, never attended Johns Hopkins University, even though she received admission, due to the cancellation of her Pell Grant. The other Wes Moore attempted to escape a life of crime, but he robbed a jewelry store on February 7, 2000, as part of a scheme with his brother, Richard Antonio "Tony" Moore, and two other men. Tony Moore shot and killed Sergeant Bruce A. Prothero during the getaway. All four were convicted of offenses related to the incident. Prothero's death left five children without a father and a wife without her husband.

Wesley Moore went to trial on first degree murder, and was convicted. Wesley Moore was sentenced to life imprisonment without parole by a judge, with the sentence reported in the press on June 9, 2001. Wesley Moore was incarcerated, and as of 2011 still was, in the Jessup Correctional Institution in Jessup, Maryland. Of the four criminals, Wesley Moore was the last to receive his sentence. Tony Moore pleaded guilty so he could not be sentenced to death, and he also received life imprisonment without parole.

Development of the book
The author first read about the other Wes circa 2000; according to the author, the article he first read was in The Baltimore Sun. Both Wes Moores grew up in low income environments and had encountered issues with illegal drugs and violence in their youths. The author mailed a letter to the prisoner, and one month later, to his surprise, got a response. The two began a mail correspondence and then the author visited the prisoner at Jessup. As part of the process, the author learned about the prisoner's history. He stated that he did not wish to judge the other and to be open in discussions so he could honestly explore the events. The author stated that he probably would not have written The Other Wes Moore if he had never gotten to know him as a person.

In addition to Moore, he interviewed members of his own family and members of the other Wes's family. In regards to interviewing his own family, the author stated that he felt humiliated by some of the details and that there were facts he was unaware of until he did the interview. He added that he had difficulty getting information out of his family, and that "At first I was getting what they wanted me to hear. At times I felt like an eight-year-old asking questions from my mom or my uncle or my grandmother." He stated that "The interviews with my family were just as tough, just hearing some of the facts about your life and your family's lives."

The author initially considered using the title "Baltimore Sons".

Contents
The book serves as both a biography of the other Wes Moore and an autobiography of the author. Sragow states "The autobiographical parts ruthlessly analyze how the writer fell into bad behavior, then developed his brain and conscience" after intervention from loved ones. Sragow stated that the book, in regards to both the biography and autobiography, "refuses to whitewash anything".

The author examines why he found success in life and the other Wes Moore did not; the author said he had a support network and had role models that encouraged him to make positive decisions, and he also added that his education provided immense help to him. Frances Romero of Time stated that "In the case of the other Wes Moore, there appears to be no clear answer as to what went wrong." The website of Oprah Winfrey also stated that in regards to the other Wes, "Now, [the author] knows there's no simple answer." Thembe Sachikonye, who had a correspondence with the author, wrote in the Zimbabwean newspaper Newsday that "The juxtaposition between their lives, and the questions it raised about accountability, chance, fate and family, had a profound impact on Wes."

The author stated that the other's mother losing her Pell Grants affected their future, and he argued that the man's future may have been different if his role models were stronger. Sragow stated that in that regard the author "acknowledges the unfairness of accident and history." However the author stated, in regards to the other Wes Moore's declaration that people will fail if people do not expect them to succeed, "I sympathized with him, but I recoiled from his ability to shed responsibility seamlessly and drape it at the feet of others." Steele stated "But the book makes it clear that personal responsibility also is paramount."

The end of the book has a listing of groups that provide services to underprivileged young people; the list has about 200 entries.

Reception
Publishers Weekly starred the review and stated it was "a moving exploration of roads not taken."

Kirkus Reviews stated the book was "A testament to the importance of youth mentoring."

Rosenthal stated that "Moore's book could be another worthy example, and a potential pick for [2011's] One Maryland, One Book program."

In her review, Romero recommended skimming the book, in regards to three ratings: read, skim, or to not read the book at all.

Moore stated that he did not receive a significant amount of mail addressed to him with criticism of the book.

Prothero's family did not give assistance to the publication of the book, nor did they agree with it. The author stated that he had no intentions of harming the Prothero family nor did he intend to provide any excuses for the murder and robbery. The author stated "but I was very careful not to glorify Wes or excuse what happened in any way, and I think most people understand that." The author added that he received some letters showing concern for Prothero.

Feature film adaptation
In April 2021, it was announced that a film adaptation of the book was in development from Unanimous Media, with Stephen Curry set to executive produce.

References

External links
 The Other Wes Moore - Random House Books
  - Official site archives
 
 

2010 non-fiction books
American memoirs
Spiegel & Grau books